Wincott is a surname. Notable people with the surname include:

 Daniel Wincott, English political scientist
 Harold Wincott (1906–1969), British economist and journalist
 Harry Wincott (1867–1947), English songwriter
 Jeff Wincott (born 1957), Canadian actor and martial artist
 Len Wincott (1907–1983), English sailor, mutineer and communist activist who defected to the Soviet Union
 Michael Wincott (born 1958), Canadian actor, younger brother of Jeff